Task may refer to:

 Task (computing), in computing, a program execution context
 Task (language instruction) refers to a certain type of activity used in language instruction
 Task (project management), an activity that needs to be accomplished within a defined period of time
 Task (teaching style)
 TASK party, a series of improvisational participatory art-related events organized by artist Oliver Herring
 Two-pore-domain potassium channel, a family of potassium ion channels

See also 
 The Task (disambiguation)
 Task force (disambiguation)
 Task switching (disambiguation)